The Hunters is the third instalment in the Brotherband novel series by Australian author John Flanagan. It was released on 30 October 2012 in the United States, 1 November 2012 in Australia and 2 November 2012 in New Zealand.

Plot
Hal, the captain of the Heron, follows Zavac with the help of Rikard, a pirate who'd been betrayed by Zavac. However, Ingvar, a big, wise, but poor-sighted boy, contracts a fever from the arrow wound he received during the battle for Limmat. The Herons wait ashore, and Rikard escapes, but Lydia and Thorn quickly track him down and capture him once again. When Ingvar's fever breaks, the Herons continue on their chase after Zavac. They follow him to a town where they find evidence of Zavac, but he has already left. The Herons let Rikard go, but one of Zavac's men kill him for treachery. The Herons are accused of murdering Rikard, but they are cleared and they continue. However, Zavac learns of the Herons following him and he pays the Gatmeister of a nearby city to detain the Herons indefinitely. The Herons escape with the help of Lydia. They burn the Gatmeister's private yacht in revenge for beating up Hal when Hal wouldn't tell the Gatmeister where their cash chest was. They continue on to the pirate fortress Raguza, where the Seahawk stops them, but with the help of the Seahawk they enter Raguza under the guise of a pirate. Zavac learns of their presence, but the Herons talk to the Kopaljo first, and the Kopaljo takes the emeralds from Zavac that he stole from Limmat. He then banishes Zavac from Raguza. However, Hal challenges Zavac in a battle of ships. Hal cripples the ship with the Mangler, but it collapses on him. Ingvar frees him, and Hal goes on board The Raven, Zavac's ship, to recover the Andomal, Skandia's greatest treasure. Zavac nearly kills Hal, but Thorn saves Hal, and pins Zavac to the sinking Raven, and the Herons return to Skandia, where they are celebrated as heroes for retrieving the Andomal.

External links 
 The Hunters at Random House Australia
 The Hunters at Random House New Zealand
 The Hunters at Penguin Group (USA)

Brotherband books
2012 Australian novels
Random House books
Philomel Books books